The 2023 Gombe State gubernatorial election will take place on 18 March 2023, to elect the Governor of Gombe State, concurrent with elections to the Gombe State House of Assembly as well as twenty-seven other gubernatorial elections and elections to all other state houses of assembly. The election—which was postponed from its original 11 March date—will be held three weeks after the presidential election and National Assembly elections. Incumbent APC Governor Muhammad Inuwa Yahaya is running for a second term and was renominated by his party.

The primaries, scheduled for between 4 April and 9 June 2022, resulted in Yahaya being renominated by the All Progressives Congress unopposed on 26 May while the Peoples Democratic Party nominated businessman Mohammed Jibrin on 25 May.

Electoral system
The Governor of Gombe State is elected using a modified two-round system. To be elected in the first round, a candidate must receive the plurality of the vote and over 25% of the vote in at least two-thirds of state local government areas. If no candidate passes this threshold, a second round will be held between the top candidate and the next candidate to have received a plurality of votes in the highest number of local government areas.

Background
Gombe State is a small, diverse northeastern state with a growing economy and vast natural areas but facing an underdeveloped yet vital agricultural sector, desertification, and some inter-ethnic violence.

Politically, the state's 2019 elections were categorized by a large swing towards the state APC. In federal elections, Buhari held the state for the APC while the APC swept all senate seats by gaining two PDP-held seats. Similarly, the APC gained two PDP-held House seats to sweep all House of Representatives elections. On the state level, the APC gained the governorship and the majority in the House of Assembly. The 2019 elections also bridged the political divide between the diverse, Christian-majority Southern region and the mainly Hausa and Fulani, Muslim-majority Northern and Central regions as the former region moved towards the APC in tandem with the latter two regions. During the 2019 to 2023 term, defections rose the PDP's numbers in the federal House while increasing APC numbers in the state assembly.

Over the course of Yahaya's term, his administration stated focuses included education, security, healthcare, and agriculture development. In terms of his performance, Yahaya was praised for healthcare development and high ease of doing business but was criticized for do-nothingness during his first year in office, lack of regular and clean drinking water, the arrests of his critics, and poor handling of the 2021 Mai Tangale appointment which led to deadly religious clashes in Billiri.

Primary elections
The primaries, along with any potential challenges to primary results, were to take place between 4 April and 3 June 2022 but the deadline was extended to 9 June.

All Progressives Congress 
The year ahead of the APC primary was categorized by a party crisis as the state APC was split between supporters of Senator and former Governor Mohammed Danjuma Goje on one side and the other side supporting incumbent Governor Muhammad Inuwa Yahaya. The crisis forced party officials to take a side and even became violent when an attack on Goje's convoy killed 5 people in November 2021. The crisis also led to some defections from the party, notably when 2019 gubernatorial candidate Jamil Isyaku Gwamna and House of Representatives member Yaya Bauchi Tango both went to the PDP. Although neither Goje nor Yahaya themselves defected, analysts stated that the prolonged party crisis and others' defections could to hurt the APC in the general election.

On the primary date, Yahaya was the sole candidate and won the nomination by voice vote unopposed. In his acceptance speech, Yahaya thanked the party and President Muhammadu Buhari while pledging to continue the work of his administration.

Nominated 
 Muhammad Inuwa Yahaya: Governor (2019–present), 2015 APC gubernatorial nominee, and former commissioner
Running mate—Manasseh Daniel Jatau: Deputy Governor (2019–present)

Declined 
 Isa Ali Pantami: Minister of Communications and Digital Economy (2019–present)

Results

People's Democratic Party 

Ahead of the primary, the main questions were around which candidate would receive the support of de facto Gombe PDP leader Ibrahim Hassan Dankwambo along with those perceived as having helped the party since entering opposition in 2019. On the primary date, the six candidates contested an indirect primary that ended with Mohammed Jibrin emerging as the PDP nominee after results showed Jibrin winning just under 50% of the delegates' votes. In late June, Jibrin picked Timothy Danlele—a retired civil servant—as his running mate.

Nominated 
 Mohammed Jibrin: 2019 APC gubernatorial candidate and banker
Running mate—Timothy Danlele: former civil servant

Eliminated in primary 
 Abubakar Ali Gombe: former Minister of State for Health
 Babayo Ardo: civil servant
 Jamil Isyaku Gwamna: MD/CEO of the Kano Electricity Distribution Company and 2019 PDP gubernatorial candidate
 Adamu Suleiman: former Air Force air vice marshal
 Gimba Ya'u Kumo: former Managing Director/CEO of the Federal Mortgage Bank of Nigeria and son-in-law of President Muhammadu Buhari

Declined 
 Usman Bayero Nafada: former Senator for Gombe North (2015–2019), 2019 PDP gubernatorial nominee, former House of Representatives member for Dukku/Nafada (2003–2015), former Deputy Speaker of the House of Representatives, former House of Assembly member, and former Speaker of the House of Assembly

Results

Minor parties 

 Nuhu Milah (Action Alliance)
Running mate: Idris Musa
 Jibrin Suleiman (Action Democratic Party)
Running mate: Mohammed Magaji
 Mohammed Adamu (Action Peoples Party)
Running mate: Aliyu Alhaji Liman
 Aliyu Danmacca Adamu (African Action Congress)
Running mate: Mariyatu Sulaiman Aliyu
 Bala Nafiu (African Democratic Congress)
Running mate: Erisa Sarki Danladi
 Bello Abubakar Muhammad (Allied Peoples Movement)
Running mate: Abubakar Rabi Chindo
 Abdulhamid Sadiq (Boot Party)
Running mate: Zariyatu Yunusa
 Keftin Esau Amuga (Labour Party)
Running mate: Saleh Lawan
 Khamisu Mailantarki (New Nigeria Peoples Party)
Running mate: Hamma Abubakar
 Abubakar Sanusi Sulaiman (National Rescue Movement)
Running mate: Ladidi Okasha
 Kelmi Jacob Lazarus (Social Democratic Party)
Running mate: Ali Ajasco Muhammed
 Muhammad Gana Aliyu (Zenith Labour Party)
Running mate: Hope Emmanuel

Campaign
Immediately after the primaries in June 2022, observers stated that the nominees were focusing on unifying their respective parties. Although the main feud between Yahaya and Senator Mohammed Danjuma Goje ended before the primaries, Goje's indifference to campaigning for Yahaya if he remained aggrieved began to be viewed as a potential liability for the APC by pundits while analysts noted that the PDP was concerned about the internal APC truce. A few months later in November, analysis again focused on internal party divides as Goje remained absent from Yahaya's campaign while Jibrin had sided with Rivers State Governor Nyesom Wike in his dispute with PDP presidential nominee Atiku Abubakar. The PDP divide had greatly escalated after a leaked audio alleged showed Jibrin	insulting opposing PDP figures coupled with pre-existing tension between Jibrin and primary runner-up Jamil Isyaku Gwamna. Despite reconciliation attempts, Gwamna left the PDP in early December with groups of supporters to rejoin the APC amid a wave of departures from the PDP throughout December.

Just days after the presidential election—in which PDP nominee Atiku Abubakar won Gombe State, Yahaya issued a broad apology to the state's Christian community during a meeting organised by the Gombe CAN chapter. In the presidential election, predominantly Christian areas like Billiri had mainly voted for PDP nominee Atiku Abubakar and LP nominee Peter Obi in the wake of years of criticism of the Gombe APC for alleged anti-Christian discrimination, most notably during the 2020 Chief Judge scandal (the Yahaya administration refusing to nominate the state's most senior judge—Justice Beatrice Iliya—to be state Chief Judge allegedly due to her Christian faith) and the 2021 Mai Tangale crisis (Yahaya's selection of a Muslim to become traditional leader over a mainly-Christian area which sparked months of protests and unrest). Nevertheless, the EiE-SBM forecast projected Jibrin to win based on "events in the presidential election and the end of Muhammadu Buhari’s influence on northern politics." On the other hand, a piece from Leadership noted that Khamisu Mailantarki (NNPP) could split the opposition vote.

Projections

Conduct

Electoral timetable

General election

Results

By senatorial district 
The results of the election by senatorial district.

By federal constituency
The results of the election by federal constituency.

By local government area 
The results of the election by local government area.

See also 
 2023 Nigerian elections
 2023 Nigerian gubernatorial elections

Notes

References 

Gombe State gubernatorial election
2023
2023 Gombe State elections
Gombe